Allen Ivar Knutson is an American mathematician who is a professor of mathematics at Cornell University.

Education 
Knutson completed his undergraduate studies at the California Institute of Technology and received a Ph.D. from the Massachusetts Institute of Technology in 1996 under the joint advisorship of Victor Guillemin and Lisa Jeffrey.

Career 
He was on the faculty at the University of California, Berkeley before moving to the University of California, San Diego in 2005 and then to Cornell University in 2009. In 2005, he and Terence Tao won the Levi L. Conant Prize of the American Mathematical Society for their paper "Honeycombs and Sums of Hermitian Matrices".

Knutson is also known for his studies of the mathematics of juggling. For five years beginning in 1990, he and fellow Caltech student David Morton held a world record for passing 12 balls.

References

Living people
20th-century American mathematicians
21st-century American mathematicians
Jugglers
California Institute of Technology alumni
Massachusetts Institute of Technology alumni
University of California, Berkeley faculty
University of California, San Diego faculty
Cornell University faculty
Scientists from California
Year of birth missing (living people)